Hawthorne High School can refer to one of several schools in North America and one in Wales, UK. The following list is ordered by country/state/province/territory and then municipality:

Hawthorne High School (Hawthorne, California)
Hawthorne High School (Florida), in Hawthorne, Florida
Hawthorne High School (New Jersey), in Hawthorne, New Jersey
Hawthorne High School (North Carolina), in Charlotte, North Carolina
Hawthorn  High School, in Rhondda Cynon Taf, Wales